Every Mother's Son is a 1926 British drama film directed by Robert Cullen and starring Rex Davis, Moore Marriott and Frederick Cooper.

Cast
 Rex Davis - David Brent
 Frederick Cooper - Tony Browning
 Jean Jay - Janet Shaw
 Moore Marriott - Nobby
 Alf Goddard - Bully
 Haddon Mason - Jonathan Brent
 Gladys Hamer - Minnie
 Johnny Butt - Tricky
 Hubert Harben - Sir Alfred Browning
 Leal Douglas - Lady Browning

References

External links

1926 films
1926 drama films
British drama films
British silent feature films
British black-and-white films
1920s English-language films
1920s British films
Silent drama films